Helen Utegaard is an American bridge player from Las Vegas, Nevada. She was born in Beijing.

Bridge accomplishments

Awards
 Fishbein Trophy (1) 1988

Wins
 North American Bridge Championships (10)
 Rockwell Mixed Pairs (1) 1974 
 Machlin Women's Swiss Teams (1) 1988 
 Wagar Women's Knockout Teams (5) 1971, 1973, 1981, 1984, 1988 
 Sternberg Women's Board-a-Match Teams (1) 1992 
 Chicago Mixed Board-a-Match (2) 1975, 1988

Runners-up
 North American Bridge Championships
 Smith Life Master Women's Pairs (1) 1975 
 Machlin Women's Swiss Teams (1) 1987 
 Wagar Women's Knockout Teams (1) 1992 
 Sternberg Women's Board-a-Match Teams (1) 1991 
 Chicago Mixed Board-a-Match (1) 1980

References

External links
 

American contract bridge players
Sportspeople from Beijing
People from the Las Vegas Valley
Living people
Year of birth missing (living people)